Ulu Paku is an area the small district of Spaoh, Sarawak, Malaysia. It is a primarily native Iban area. It is made up of 11 Iban longhouses (not including Anyut area). The longhouses here, despite being called longhouses are relatively short with the longest is only around 25  or houses. The longhouses are:

Kerangan Pinggai
Anyut (sub-area of Ulu Paku)
Samu
Jukun
Sapuna
Nanga Bong
Danau
Senunok
Penom
Lubuk Kelampu (Meroh Ili)
Nanga Paun (Meroh Ulu)

External links 
 Penom Longhouse Website

Betong District
Populated places in Sarawak